Ostend is a coastal city and municipality, located in the province of West Flanders in the Flemish Region of Belgium. It comprises the boroughs of Mariakerke, Raversijde, Stene and Zandvoorde, and the city of Ostend proper – the largest on the Belgian coast.

History

Origin to Middle Ages

In the Early Middle Ages, Ostend was a small village built on the east-end of an island (originally called Testerep) between the North Sea and a beach lake. Although small, the village rose to the status of "town" around 1265, when the inhabitants were allowed to hold a market and to build a market hall.

The major source of income for the inhabitants was fishing. The North Sea coastline has always been rather unstable due to the power of the water. In 1395 the inhabitants decided to build a new Ostend behind large dikes and further away from the always-threatening sea.

15th to 18th century

The strategic position on the North Sea coast had major advantages for Ostend as a harbour but also proved to be a source of trouble. The town was frequently taken, ravaged, ransacked and destroyed by conquering armies. The Dutch rebels, the Gueuzen, took control of the town. The Siege of Ostend, 1601 to 1604, of which it was said that "the Spanish assailed the unassailable and the Dutch defended the indefensible", cost a combined total of more than 80,000 dead or wounded, making it the single bloodiest battle of the Eighty Years' War. This shocking event set in motion negotiations that led to a truce several years later.  When the truce broke down, it became a Dunkirker base.

After this era, Ostend was turned into a harbour of some importance. In 1722, the Dutch again closed off the entrance to the world's biggest harbour of Antwerp, the Westerschelde. Therefore, Ostend rose in importance because the town provided an alternative exit to the sea. The Belgium Austriacum had become part of the Austrian Empire. The Austrian Emperor Charles VI granted the town the trade monopoly with Africa and the Far-East. The Oostendse Compagnie (Ostend trade company) was allowed to found colonies overseas. However, in 1727 the Oostendse Compagnie was forced to stop its activities because of Dutch and British pressure. The Netherlands and Britain would not allow competitors on the international trade level. Both nations regarded international trade as "their" privilege.

19th century
On 19 September 1826 the local artillery magazine exploded. At least 20 people were killed and a further 200 injured. The affluent quarter of d'Hargras was levelled and scarcely a building in the city escaped damage. Disease followed the devastation leading to further deaths.

The harbour of Ostend continued to expand because the harbour dock, as well as the traffic connections with the hinterland, were improved. In 1838, a railway connection with Brussels was constructed.  Ostend became a transit harbour to England in 1846 when the first ferry sailed to Dover.   An October 1854 meeting of American envoys led to the Ostend Manifesto.   Important for the image of the town was the attention it started to receive from the Belgian kings Leopold I and Leopold II. Both monarchs liked to spend their holidays in Ostend. Important monuments and villas were built to please the Royal Family, including the Hippodrome Wellington horse racing track and the Royal Galleries. The rest of aristocratic Belgium followed and soon Ostend became known as "the queen of the Belgian sea-side resorts".

In 1866, Ostend was the venue for a crucial meeting of exile Spanish Liberals and Republicans which laid the framework for a major uprising in their country,  culminating in Spain's Glorious Revolution two years later.

20th century
Ostend (in common with nearly the entirety of the country) was occupied by German forces and used as an access point to the sea for submarines and other light naval forces for much of the duration of World War I. As a consequence the port was subjected to two naval assaults by the Royal Navy.

The town hosted all of the sailing events for the 1920 Summer Olympics for Antwerp. Only the finals of the 12 foot dinghy were sailed in Amsterdam. Ostend also hosted the polo events.

World War II involved a second occupation of the town by Germany within a period of little more than twenty years; an occupation which it shared this time with most of northern Europe. Both conflicts brought significant destruction to Ostend. In addition, other opulent buildings which had survived the wars were later replaced with structures in the modernist architecture style.

21st century
Ostend's Winter in the Park festival draws more than 600,000 people to the seaside city.  During December, Ostend's Christmas market, one of the largest in Europe, features vendors and food sellers along with ice skating, music and other events.  A light-show tunnel on one of the major shopping streets attracts and amuses visitors from all over Belgium, Europe and beyond.

Sights
Ostend is known for its sea-side esplanade, including the Royal Galleries of Ostend, pier, and fine-sand beaches. Ostend is visited by many day-trippers heading to the beaches, especially during July and August. Tourists from inland Belgium and from abroad mostly arrive by train (day trips) and head for the closest beach area, the Klein Strand, located next to the pier. The locals and other residents in Belgium usually occupy the larger beach (het Groot Strand).

Near the beach is a well-preserved section of the fortified Atlantic Wall, open to the public as the Atlantic Wall Open Air Museum located in Raversijde. One can walk through the streets around Het Vissersplein. At certain times, there are markets in the neighbourhood streets and in the summer the Vissersplein has music festivals. The Vissersplein (Bonenstraat/Kadzandstraat) is a car free zone with many brasseries where patrons can sit outside and have a drink. Towards the port side there are many little fish outlets, and beyond that the ferries can be observed docking.

Notable sites include:

 the Casino and Fort Napoleon, Ostend
 Oostende railway station
 The Mercator, the ex–training sailing ship for Belgian merchant navy officers, now open to the public to view
 Hippodrome Wellington, horse racing venue
 St Petrus and St Paulus Church, Ostend (Sint-Petrus-en-Pauluskerk), built in Neo Gothic style
 King Leopold II statue

Museums
The James Ensor museum can be visited in the house where the artist lived from 1917 until 1949.

Climate
Ostend has a maritime temperate climate, influenced by winds from the North Sea, making summers cooler than inland Europe. 24-hour average temperatures below the freezing point is a rare occurrence.  According to the Köppen Climate Classification system, Ostend has a marine west coast climate, abbreviated "Cfb" on climate maps.

Transport
Ostend–Bruges International Airport located 5 km (3 miles) from Ostend is primarily a freight airport but offers passenger flights to leisure destinations in Southern Europe and Turkey. TUI fly Belgium has its headquarters in Ostend. TAAG Angola Airlines's Ostend offices are on the grounds of Ostend Airport.

The Ostend railway station is a major hub on the National Railway Company of Belgium network with frequent InterCity trains serving Brugge railway station, Gent-Sint-Pieters, Brussels South and Liège-Guillemins on Belgian railway line 50A. The Coast Tram connects Ostend with De Panne to the south and Knokke-Heist in the north.

Ostend formerly had busy ferry routes to Dover and Ramsgate, but the last of these services ended with the failure of TransEuropa Ferries in 2013.

Gallery

Notable residents
References to these notable citizens of Ostend can be found on the oostende.be website.

Sport clubs
 BC Oostende (basketball)
 Hermes Volley Oostende (volleyball)
 K.V. Oostende (football)
 Wellington Golf Oostende (golf)

In popular culture
Ostend has been used as a film location by numerous directors. The movies Place Vendôme with Catherine Deneuve; Daughters of Darkness with Delphine Seyrig as Countess Bathory; Armaguedon with Alain Delon; Camping Cosmos with Lolo Ferrari; and Ex Drummer, based on the novel by Herman Brusselmans; were partially shot in Ostend.

The comic , about a dreadful invasion of rats, is set in Ostend.

See also
 Greenbridge science park
 Ostend Manifesto
 Port of Ostend

References

Further reading

External links

 
  , limited information available in French, English and German.
 Toerisme Oostende – English edition – extensive .

 
Municipalities of West Flanders
Olympic sailing venues
Populated coastal places in Belgium
Port cities and towns in Belgium
Port cities and towns of the North Sea
Ports and harbours of the English Channel
Seaside resorts in Belgium
Venues of the 1920 Summer Olympics